L'Action sénégalaise ('Senegalese Action') was a French language weekly newspaper published from Saint-Louis, Senegal. The publication was founded in 1922. From 1931 to 1934, Ahmed Sow Télémaque was the director of the newspaper.

References

1922 establishments in Senegal
Defunct newspapers published in Senegal
Defunct weekly newspapers
French-language newspapers published in Africa
Newspapers published in Senegal
Newspapers established in 1922
Publications with year of disestablishment missing